is a probable rare-type binary asteroid classified as near-Earth object of the Amor group, approximately 2.3 kilometers in diameter. It was discovered on 11 October 1990, by Japanese astronomers Seiji Ueda and Hiroshi Kaneda at Kushiro Observatory near Kushiro, in eastern Hokkaido, Japan.

Orbit 

The asteroid orbits the Sun at a distance of 1.2–3.1 AU once every 3 years and 2 months (1,147 days). Its orbit has an eccentricity of 0.44 and an inclination of 8° with respect to the ecliptic. The body's observation arc begins with its first observation at the Siding Spring Observatory, five months prior to its official discovery observation at Kushiro.

Lightcurve 

In December 2012, the so far best rated rotational lightcurve was obtained by American astronomer Brian Warner at his Palmer Divide Observatory in Colorado. Lightcurve analysis gave a rotation period of 3.1999 hours with a brightness variation of 0.12 magnitude.

Diameter and albedo 

According to the surveys carried out by the Spitzer Space Telescope and NASA's Wide-field Infrared Survey Explorer with its subsequent NEOWISE mission, the asteroid measures 2.03 and 2.723 kilometers in diameter and its surface has an albedo of 0.19 and 0.66. The Collaborative Asteroid Lightcurve Link assumes an albedo of 0.18 and derives a diameter of 2.3 kilometers based on an absolute magnitude of 15.67.

References

External links 
 Lightcurve plot of (5646) 1990 TR, Palmer Divide Observatory, B. D. Warner (2012)
 Asteroids with Satellites, Robert Johnston, johnstonsarchive.net
 Asteroid Lightcurve Database (LCDB), query form (info )
 Dictionary of Minor Planet Names, Google books
 Asteroids and comets rotation curves, CdR – Observatoire de Genève, Raoul Behrend
 
 
 

005646
Discoveries by Hiroshi Kaneda
Discoveries by Seiji Ueda
005646
005646
19901011